ECDL is an acronym which may refer to:

 El Canto del Loco, a Spanish pop group
 European Computer Driving Licence, a computer literacy certification 
 European Conference on Digital Libraries, an international conference series
 External Cavity Diode Laser, a configuration of a stable diode laser.